Sanga may refer to:

People 
Sanga, a Roman cognomen
Rana Sanga (c. 1482–1528), king from the Sisodia dynasty
Kumar Sangakkara (born 1977), Sri Lankan cricketer
Sanga (wrestler) (born 1984), ring name of professional wrestler Saurav Gurjar

Places
Sanga, Angola, a town and commune in the municipality of Cela, Angola
Sanga, Bhiwani, a village in the Haryana, India
Sanga, Democratic Republic of the Congo, a village in Katanga Province, Democratic Republic of the Congo
Sanga, Gabon, a village in Nyanga Province, Gabon
Sanga, Ghana, a village in Tamale Metropolitan District, Northern Region, Ghana
Sanga, Nigeria, a local government area of Kaduna State, Nigeria
Sanga, Mali, a group of villages in Mopti region, Mali
Sanga, Mozambique, a town in Sanga District, Mozambique
Sanga District, a district of Mozambique
Nasiksthan Sanga, a village development committee in Kavrepalanchok District, central Nepal
Sanga, Uganda, a town in Kiruhura District, Western Region, Uganda

Other uses
Sanga people, an ethnic group in Katanga, Democratic Republic of Congo
Sanga language (Bantu), a language of the Democratic Republic of Congo
Sanga language (Nigeria), a language of Nigeria
Sanga, a variety of Dogon spoken in and around Sanga, Mali
Sanga cattle, various African cattle breeds
Sanga, an Australian diminutive term for a sandwich
, a Hansa A Type cargo ship in service 1944–45

See also
 Sangah, a Cameroonian dish
 Sangh (disambiguation)
 Sangha (disambiguation)
 Sangam (disambiguation)

Language and nationality disambiguation pages